The franc was the currency of Algeria between 1848 and 1964. It was subdivided into 100 centimes.

History
The franc replaced the budju when France occupied the country. It was equivalent to the French franc and was revalued in 1960 at a rate of 100 old francs = 1 new franc to maintain the equivalence. The new franc was replaced at par by the dinar in 1964 following Algerian independence in 1962.

Coins
Except for 20, 50 and 100 franc coins issued between 1949 and 1956, Algeria used the same coins as metropolitan France.

Banknotes

The Banque de l'Algérie introduced its first notes in 1861. Denominations of 5, 10, 50, 100, 500 and 1,000 francs were introduced by 1873 although the 10-franc note was issued only in 1871. In 1944, notes were issued in the name of the Région économique d'Algérie in denominations of 50 centimes and 1 and 2 francs. The Bank of Algeria introduced notes worth 10,000 francs and 5,000 francs in 1945 and 1946, respectively.

In 1949, the Banque de l'Algérie et de la Tunisie commenced banknote issue, with denominations of 500, 1,000, 5,000 and 10,000 francs. The notes were overprinted with denominations of 5, 10, 50 and 100 new francs in 1960. The Bank of Algeria resumed note production with the introduction of the new franc and produced a final series of notes for 5, 10, 50 and 100 new francs until 1961.

References

External link

Modern obsolete currencies
Currencies of Algeria
French Algeria
1848 establishments in Algeria
1964 disestablishments in Algeria